Alina Aleksandrovna Korneeva (born 23 June 2007) is a Russian tennis player. On her junior grand slam debut she won the  2023 Australian Open girls' singles title.

Career

2021
Korneeva finished runner-up at the European Championship under-14 girls singles to the Czech player Tereza Valentova.

2022
On the junior circuit in 2022 Korneeva’s tally of six singles titles saw her claim the most singles titles in girls’ tennis that year. Korneeva won her first W15 event in Casablanca in September 2022 defeating Laura Hietaranta in the final.

2023
On her junior grand-slam debut Korneeva had success at the 2023 Australian Open reaching the semi-final of the girls' doubles alongside partner Mirra Andreeva, and beating Andreeva in three sets in the final of the girls' singles. Before their final Andreeva had said “She is a really good friend of mine, my best friend.” After the match Korneeva told her on court “It’s not our last battle. We will have a lot of good matches when you will win, when I will win ... it was a hard battle.”
In the quarter-final of the girls singles Korneeva had defeated Tereza Valentova who was the number 2 seed and 18 months previously had defeated  Korneeva in the final of the European Champs at under-14 level.

Personal life
From Siberia, Korneeva sometimes travels on tour with her mother. Korneeva has been nicknamed the “mini Sharapova” in some quarters.

ITF finals

Singles: 1 (title)

References

2007 births
Living people
Russian female tennis players
21st-century Russian women
Grand Slam (tennis) champions in girls' singles
Australian Open (tennis) junior champions